Antoni Jan Szymanowski (born 13 January 1951 in Tomaszów Mazowiecki) is a former Polish football right-back, and a member of the Poland national football team in two FIFA World Cups: 1974 and 1978. During those tournaments his club was Wisła Kraków. Szymanowski was one of the best defenders in Poland during the golden era of Polish football. In the later years of his career he played for the Belgian team Club Brugge KV. Currently he is a manager of Przebój Wolbrom - the club playing in Polish IV Liga . He has also a brother (Henryk Szymanowski) who  was a footballer as well.

He also competed for Poland at the 1972 and 1976 Summer Olympics.

Honours

Club
 Polish Cup: 1967
 UEFA Intertoto Cup: 1969, 1970 & 1973
 Ekstraklasa: 1978

International
 Olympic gold medal: 1972
 Olympic silver medal: 1976
 FIFA World Cup third place: 1974

Individual
 Polish Football Player of the Year: 1975 (Sport editors plebiscite "Golden Shoe")

References

External links
 
 Poland Appearances

Living people
1951 births
People from Tomaszów Mazowiecki
Sportspeople from Łódź Voivodeship
Association football fullbacks
Polish footballers
Wisła Kraków players
Club Brugge KV players
Belgian Pro League players
1974 FIFA World Cup players
1978 FIFA World Cup players
Poland international footballers
Footballers at the 1972 Summer Olympics
Footballers at the 1976 Summer Olympics
Olympic footballers of Poland
Olympic gold medalists for Poland
Olympic silver medalists for Poland
Polish football managers
MKS Cracovia managers
Olympic medalists in football
Gwardia Warsaw players
Medalists at the 1976 Summer Olympics
Medalists at the 1972 Summer Olympics
Przebój Wolbrom managers
Ekstraklasa players